The vice chairpersons of the National Committee of the Chinese People's Political Consultative Conference (CPPCC) are deputies to the chairman of the Chinese People's Political Consultative Conference. The official responsibility of the vice chairpersons is to assist the CPPCC chairman with the leadership of the CPPCC Standing Committee.

History 
News reports have suggested that the position of CPPCC Vice Chairperson, as a state-level post with a retirement age of 70, has been used as a device to extend the services of valued officials beyond the typical retirement age for their position. The appointment of People's Bank of China Governor Zhou Xiaochuan as a vice chairperson in 2013 was said to be for this purpose.

List of officeholders

References

See also 

 National Committee of the Chinese People's Political Consultative Conference
 Chairperson
 Secretary-General
 Standing Committee of the National People's Congress
 Vice Chairpersons

 
1949 establishments in China